St. Mary's Church in Katowice is one of the oldest churches in Katowice, Poland, dating back to 19th century. This neo-Gothic church is located in the Śródmieście district.

Mary
Gothic Revival church buildings in Poland
19th-century Roman Catholic church buildings in Poland